Gnatholea simplex is a species of longhorn beetle native to India, Sri Lanka, Taiwan and Myanmar.

It is a sapwood borer which shows annual lifecycle. It can be prolonged up to three years by dry conditions. Adults are usually visible during May to August. Host plants of the larva include Hardwickia binata, Albizia odoratissima, Millettia pinnata, Pongamia glabra, Shorea robusta.

References 

Cerambycinae
Insects of Sri Lanka
Insects of India
Insects of Myanmar
Insects of Taiwan
Insects described in 1890